Laurel Creek Covered Bridge is a historic covered bridge located near Lillydale, Monroe County, West Virginia. It was built in 1910. The shortest covered bridge in the state, it measures 34 feet, 6 inches long and 13 feet, 2 1/2 inches wide.  It has wood siding painted red and a galvanized metal roof.  By 1981, it was one of only 17 covered bridges left in West Virginia.

It was listed on the National Register of Historic Places in 1981.

References

See also
List of covered bridges in West Virginia

Covered bridges on the National Register of Historic Places in West Virginia
Buildings and structures in Monroe County, West Virginia
Tourist attractions in Monroe County, West Virginia
Transportation in Monroe County, West Virginia
National Register of Historic Places in Monroe County, West Virginia
Bridges completed in 1910
Road bridges on the National Register of Historic Places in West Virginia
Wooden bridges in West Virginia